NGC 7789 (also known as Caroline's Rose or the White Rose Cluster) is an open cluster in Cassiopeia that was discovered by Caroline Herschel in 1783. Her brother William Herschel included it in his catalog as H VI.30. This cluster is also known as the "White Rose" Cluster or "Caroline's Rose" Cluster because when seen visually, the loops of stars and dark lanes look like the swirling pattern of rose petals as seen from above.

References

External links
 
 
 SEDS – NGC 7789

7789
Open clusters
Cassiopeia (constellation)
Astronomical objects discovered in 1783
Discoveries by Caroline Herschel